Alfred Kaucsar (born 8 April 1913) was a Romanian footballer who played for as a defender. His brother, Joseph Kaucsar, was also a footballer, they played together at SO Montpellier. Alfred Kaucsar was the first Romanian footballer that played for Lyon.

References

1913 births
Year of death missing
Romanian footballers
Montpellier HSC players
Olympique Lyonnais players
Stade Rennais F.C. players
FC Sochaux-Montbéliard players
Ligue 1 players
Ligue 2 players
Romanian emigrants to France
Association football defenders
Sportspeople from Târgu Mureș